Eduardo Callejo de la Cuesta (1875–1950) was a Spanish jurist, politician and professor of the University of Valladolid who served as Minister of Public Instruction and Fine Arts during the Civil Directory of the Primo de Rivera dictatorship (1925–1930). His institutional career ended with his office presiding over the Council of State in Francoist Spain.

Early life 
Born on 21 September 1875 in Madrid, he moved to Sigüenza when he was eight and later to Cáceres, where he did the latest years of his secondary school education and passed the Baccalaureate. He started his university studies in law at the Central University of Madrid, graduated the University of Valladolid and obtained a PhD in the same area at the Central University. He was employed by the Audience of Seville from 1902 to 1905, when he returned to Valladolid to work in the later city audience. He became a lawyer in 1908 and in 1912 obtained the chair of Natural Law at the Faculty of Law of the University of Valladolid.

Political career
From 1925 to 193, he served as Minister of Public Instruction and Fine Arts of the Primo de Rivera dictatorship.
The attempted enactment of Article 53 of the Law of University Reform, promoted by Callejo in 1928, equating private education (Augustinian and Jesuit religious institutions in particular) with public education for the purposes of the issuance of academic degrees. That generated a wave of unrest and protests by the students. In 1930, soon after the end of the Primo de Rivera government, he joined the National Monarchist Union along other nostalgics for the regime such as José Calvo Sotelo, Ramiro de Maeztu and the son of the dictator, José Antonio.

After the onset of the Spanish State, he was designated member of the Cortes Españolas in 1943. In 1945, he was appointed as President of the Council of State and served until his death on 21 January 1950 in Madrid.

References

Bibliography 
 
 
 
 
 

1875 births
1950 deaths
Academic staff of the University of Valladolid
Education ministers of Spain
Dictatorship of Primo de Rivera